Jung Young-keun (Hangul: 정영근; born 15 April 1990) is a South Korean male badminton player.

Achievements

BWF International Challenge/Series
Men's Doubles

Mixed Doubles

 BWF International Challenge tournament
 BWF International Series tournament
 BWF Future Series tournament

References

External links 
 

1990 births
Living people
South Korean male badminton players